also known as the Bandai Namco Group and generally Bandai Namco, is a Japanese multinational holding company, production enterprise and entertainment conglomerate headquartered in Minato, Tokyo, formed from the merger of Bandai and Namco on September 29, 2005. The company specializes in toys, video games, arcades, anime, restaurants, and amusement parks. 

The company's headquarters are in Minato, Tokyo. Their US branch, Bandai Namco Holdings USA, was officially formed on January 6, 2008, and handles the US operations of the company from their headquarters in Irvine, California. As of 2017, Bandai Namco is the world's largest toy company, earning  in annual revenue.

History

Namco Bandai Holdings was created in 2005, when toy maker Bandai and video game developer Namco performed a management integration. Officially, Namco was purchased by Bandai for $1.7 billion. 57% of the company's holding went to Bandai while 43% went to Namco. Furthermore, Bandai swapped one of its shares for 1.5 shares of the new Namco Bandai. Namco traded evenly with a one-for-one share, carried out via a share exchange. The shareholders of Namco received one NBHD share for each Namco share and the shareholders of Bandai received 1.5 NBHD shares for each Bandai share. Prior to the merger, Bandai and Namco had various subsidiaries that worked under them. After the merger of Bandai Namco, the respective Bandai and Namco subsidiaries were re-designated into different areas of the combined conglomerate.

On March 31, 2006, Namco merged with Bandai's video game operations to form Namco Bandai Games. Namco's video arcade and amusement park divisions were spun-off into a new subsidiary that retained the Namco branding.

In September 2006, BNHD acquired CCP Co., Ltd. from Casio and made it a wholly owned subsidiary. BNHD have since fully acquired developers Banpresto (whose video game operations were absorbed into Bandai Namco Games on April 1, 2008) and Namco Tales Studio since the merger. Formerly, both were partially owned by Bandai and Namco respectively.

The business of Bandai Networks Co., Ltd. was merged into Bandai Namco Games in April 2009 and Bandai Networks subsequently ceased to exist as a separate company.

Namco Bandai bought a 34% stake in Atari Europe on May 14, 2009, paving the way for its acquisition from Infogrames. Until June 30, 2012, Infogrames had the option to sell the other 66% in Atari Europe to NBHD. Between June 31, 2012, to June 20, 2013, Bandai Namco gained the option to acquire the 66% stake. On July 7, 2009, Bandai Namco Holdings bought 100% of Atari Australia Pty Ltd. BNHD acquired 100% of the shares of Atari Asia Holdings Pty. Ltd. and 100% of the shares of Atari UK Ltd.

Bandai Namco acquired D3 Inc., the parent company of D3 Publisher, on March 18, 2009, after first acquiring a 95% stake in the company. In August 2013, Bandai Namco opened a studio in Vancouver, broadening its reach for western demographics.

In October 2019, Bandai Namco Holdings announced plans to acquire Sotsu, a move which will grant the company rights to the entire Gundam franchise, which the company already holds part of due to owning the studio Sunrise and due to Bandai being one of the producers of the series.

The company acquired minority stake in Limbic Entertainment in February 2021.

The company unveiled a new logo and a new mission statement in September 2021 which will be implemented starting in April 1, 2022, to commemorate the 72nd anniversary of the founding as Bandai five years before the founding of Namco. The company's updated purpose was "the idea of connecting and working together to create things", and plans to work with fans of their games through communication to help plan how the company will go forward. As part of that, the new logo is based on a fukidashi, a speech bubble that represents both the worldwide influence of Japanese manga as well as their efforts to be communicative with players. On February 8, 2022, the company changed the color of their new logo from magenta to rose red. 

In July 2022, Bandai Namco confirmed that an unspecified party hacked the company, gaining unauthorized access to internal systems to multiple groups in Asia outside Japan.

Corporate structure
Bandai Namco Holdings is headquartered in the Sumitomo Fudosan Mita Building in Minato, Tokyo, Japan. Its North American branch, Bandai Namco Holdings USA, has offices in Anaheim and El Segundo (both in Southern California). The company's European and Asian divisions, Bandai Namco Holdings UK and Bandai Namco Holdings Asia, are respectively headquartered in Richmond, London and Central, Hong Kong.

Bandai Namco Holdings is headed by president Mitsuaki Taguchi and chairman Shukuo Ishikawa, both of whom took their respective positions in 2018. The company's corporate structure is grounded in the relationships between its employees and subsidiaries; Bandai Namco believes that the health and motivation of its employees is necessary to sustain operations, as it allows for additional creative freedom in its array of products. As of 2019, Bandai Namco is the world's largest toy company by revenue, having accumulated over $6.5 billion. It is among the largest and most profitable companies in Japan with over 189.8 billion as of 2020.

In February 2021, Bandai Namco Holdings announced the merger of its business units. As part of the changes to be done in April 2021, it will reduce its operating units from five to three. Toys & Hobby and Network Entertainment Unit (video games) merged to form Entertainment Unit, Visual and Music Production Unit (production and distribution of anime and music) and IP Creation Unit (Production of anime) merged to form IP Production Unit and Real Entertainment Unit was renamed Amusement Unit (theme parks).

Content units and subsidiaries
Bandai Namco Holdings is structured into six product areas known as Content Units: Toys and Hobby (toys), Network Entertainment (video games), Real Entertainment (amusement parks), Visual and Music Production (anime and music albums), IP Creation (creation of new intellectual properties), and Affiliated Business (supporting companies). The Network Entertainment Unit serves as the core area of the company, where it is led by Bandai Namco Entertainment, the company's video game publishing arm. Bandai Namco Entertainment owns multiple subsidiaries, including Bandai Namco Studios, B.B. Studio, and D3 Publisher, all of which develop video games for home video game systems and cellular phones across the world. It holds multiple international divisions itself, including offices in the United States, Europe, and Taiwan.

The Toy and Hobby Unit is led by Bandai, who designs toys and electronic devices based on licenses such as Dragon Ball, Gundam, and Sailor Moon. Bandai Spirits designs toys intended for more mature audiences, alongside prizes for video arcades. MegaHouse designs figurines and toys for candy machines, as does Heart Corporation for seasonal events. Other companies under the unit include Seeds, which produces medical equipment; Plex, a designer of toys based on licensed characters; Sun-Star, which designs and distributes stationery to consumers and Japanese school systems; CCP, a producer of sundries and consumer electronics; and Banpresto Sales, a distributor of prizes for arcades.

Bandai Namco Amusement, known as simply Namco until 2018, heads the Real Entertainment Unit. Amusement designs arcade games and maintains the company's amusement parks, including Namco Namja Town, Wonder Bowl, and its VR Zone locations. Video games designed by Amusement include Time Crisis 5, Star Wars Battle Pod, Pac-Man Racing, and Galaga Fever. In addition, Amusement provides services for Bandai Namco's "Banacoin" digital currency platform and mobile applications to promote events at its arcades. Assisting the company are Bandai Namco Technica and Bandai Namco Amusement Lab, which provide repair services and research & development (R&D) operations respectively. Hanayashiki Co., Ltd. operates Japan's oldest surviving theme park of the same name, while PleasureCast maintains and opens amusement centers across Japan. The Visual and Music Production is hemmed by Bandai Namco Arts and Actas, anime production studios; Highway Star, a music artist manager; and Bandai Namco Live Creative, handling ticket sales and production of live concerts.

Sunrise, a Japanese anime studio known for productions such as Mobile Suit Gundam and Cowboy Bebop, is the center of the IP Creation Unit. Sunrise holds three subsidiaries—music copyright manager Sunrise Music, animation planner Sunrise Beyond, and production house Bandai Namco Pictures—which are also part of the unit. Sotsu is an advertising agency that also provides planning and productions for anime series such as Gundam. Bandai Namco's Affiliated Business comprises companies that provide additional support and resources. Companies under this unit include the product distributors Bandai Logipal and Logipal Express, finance manager Bandai Namco Business Arc, day care facility operator Kaikaya, toy distributor Happinet, graphic design studio Artpresto, and disability supporter Bandai Namco Will.

Notes

References

External links

 

 
Anime companies
Conglomerate companies based in Tokyo
Conglomerate companies established in 2005
Conglomerate companies of Japan
Companies listed on the Tokyo Stock Exchange
Entertainment companies of Japan
Entertainment companies established in 2005
Holding companies based in Tokyo
Holding companies established in 2005
Japanese companies established in 2005
Keiretsu
Manufacturing companies established in 2005
Manufacturing companies based in Tokyo
Mass media companies established in 2005
Mass media companies of Japan
Mass media companies based in Tokyo
Multinational companies headquartered in Japan
Video game companies established in 2005
Video game companies of Japan